Superman: Last Son of Krypton is a novel written by Elliot S. Maggin and based on the DC Comics character Superman. It was published in 1978. The novel was published as a tie-in to the release of Superman: The Movie, with an image of Christopher Reeve on the cover and (in its original edition) a section of photographs from the film. The novel is not, however, a novelization of the film, and in fact diverges from the film story.

Plot summary
Last Son of Krypton is Elliot S. Maggin's first Superman novel. It tells the "life story" of Superman; from his birth on the planet Krypton, to his childhood in Smallville and his career as Superboy, to his arrival in Metropolis and his career as Superman. The main antagonist in this story is a mysterious alien ruler with ties to Superman's past. Superman and his greatest enemy, Lex Luthor, must join forces to retrieve a document written by Albert Einstein and stop the alien ruler.

History 
From a 1996 amazon.com interview of the author, Elliot S. Maggin (original removed from Amazon.com):

Maggin said in 1997 that he knew that "nobody at DC with any clout" read the book, because no one prevented him from using the Xerox trademark when discussing an extraterrestrial criminal enterprise that smuggles the company's photocopiers (the best in the galaxy) from Earth. Maggin said that "the Xerox Corporation's response, by the way, was to buy fifty-thousand copies of Last Son for their employee book club".

Audiobook
In 2018, Maggin did an audiobook reading of the novel on his podcast, "Elliot Makes Stuff Up".

References

External links 
Last Son of Krypton e-book
online Audiobook version

1978 American novels
Superman novels